Crvenkovski is a Macedonian surname. Notable people with the surname include:

Branko Crvenkovski (born 1962), President of the Republic of Macedonia
Krste Crvenkovski (1921–2001), Yugoslavian communist leader
Stevo Crvenkovski (1947–2004), Macedonian diplomat

Macedonian-language surnames